The results of the 2015, 6th Tarang Cine Awards, was presented annually by the Tarang entertainment television channel to honor artistic and technical excellence in the Oriya language film industry of India ("Ollywood"), are as follow:

References

2015 Indian film awards
Tarang Cine Awards